Damon James Trigger (born 22 April 1972) is a New Zealand-born former English cricketer.  Trigger was a right-handed batsman who bowled right-arm medium-fast.  He was born at Lower Hutt, Wellington.

Trigger represented the Kent Cricket Board in List A cricket.  His debut List A match came against Denmark in the 1999 NatWest Trophy.  From 1999 to 2003, he represented the Board in 10 List A matches, the last of which came against Derbyshire in the 2003 Cheltenham & Gloucester Trophy.  In his 10 List A matches, he scored 56 runs at a batting average of 11.20, with a high score of 18*.  In the field he took a single catch.  With the ball he took 14 wickets at a bowling average of 27.64, with best figures of 3/53.

References

External links
Damon Trigger at Cricinfo
Damon Trigger at CricketArchive

1972 births
Living people
Cricketers from Lower Hutt
English people of New Zealand descent
English cricketers
Kent Cricket Board cricketers